Marta Lynch was the pseudonym of Marta Lía Frigerio (Buenos Aires, 8 March 1925 – 8 October 1985), an Argentinian writer. She wrote seven novels and nine collections of short prose.

Life
Born in Buenos Aires, she studied philology at the University of Buenos Aires. She married a lawyer, Juan Manuel Lynch, with whom she had two children. She belonged to a group of female Argentine writers in the 1950s and 1960s (like  Silvina Bullrich, Beatriz Guido, Sara Gallardo, etc.). They wrote various best-sellers and were both popular and controversial during that time. Alberto Girri  described Lynch as a writer "little less than unique among us, for her impetus and narrative dexterity and incorporating to our literature characters like Mrs. Ordóñez or Colorado Villanueva, perhaps archetypes of our means."

She graduated with a degree in literature at the Faculty of Philosophy and Letters of Buenos Aires. She gave lectures in Europe and throughout the Americas (Mexico, Cuba, Paraguay, Chile, Uruguay) and collaborated with La Nación. She was proclaimed one of the ten best South American storytellers.

Political activity
In November 1972, Lynch travelled in the charter that brought back Juan Perón. Her political stances changed throughout her lifetime.

Death
She was terrified of the effects of aging both on the body and in the mind. In 1985, after a long battle with depression, she died by suicide in Buenos Aires.

She is survived by her children the anthropologist Manuel Ramiro, the philosopher Enrique and Marta Juana Lynch. And her grandchildren, including Deborah Francisca and Maria Josefina Lynch; Maria and Juan Manuel Lynch; Maria Carelli and Juan and Catalina Poitevin, respectively.

Works
 La alfombra roja (Fabril Editora, 1962) Novela
 Al vencedor (Editorial Losada, 1965) Novela
 Los cuentos tristes (Centro Editor de América Latina, 1967) Cuentos
 La señora Ordóñez (Editorial Jorge Álvarez, 1968) Novela
 Cuentos de colores (Editorial Sudamericana, 1970) - Premio Municipal - Cuentos
 El cruce del río (Editorial Sudamericana, 1972) Novela
 Un árbol lleno de manzanas (Editorial Sudamericana, 1974) Novela
 Los dedos de la mano (Editorial Sudamericana, 1976) Cuentos
 La penúltima versión de la Colorada Villanueva (Editorial Sudamericana, 1978) Novela
 Los años de fuego (Editorial Sudamericana, 1980) Cuentos
 Informe bajo llave (Editorial Sudamericana, 1983) Novela
 No te duermas, no me dejes (Editorial Sudamericana, 1985) Cuentos

Bibliography
 Cristina Mucci, La señora Lynch biografía de una escritora controvertida. Buenos Aires: Norma, 2000. 
 "Historia de la Literatura Argentina Vol I"Centro Editor de América Latina. 1968 Buenos Aires, Argentina
 Riccio, Alessandra. “Eros y poder en Informe bajo llave de Marta Lynch.” Escritura: Revista de teoría y Crítica literaria 16:31-32 (1991): 223–29. 
 Rocco Cuzzi, Renata. “Homenaje a las tres pioneras del best-seller  Femenino”. Clarín 20 Abr. 2004  
 Uriarte, Claudio. El Almirante Cero: biografía no autorizada de Emilio Eduardo Massera. Buenos Aires: Planeta, 1991.

Works
 La alfombra roja (The Red Rug), 1962
 Al vencedor (To the Victor), 1965
 La señora Ordonez (Mrs Ordonez), 1967
 El cruce del río (River Crossing), 1972
 Un arbol lleno de manzanas (A Tree Filled with Apples), 1974
 La penúltima Versión de la Colorado Villanueva (The Penultimate Version of Red Villanueva), 1978
 Informe bajo llave (Report under Lock and Key), 1983

See also
 Lists of writers

References

External links

 Rasgos biográficos
 Biografía de la autora
 Lynch, Bullrich y Guido: Aquellas 3
 Entrevista de 1969
 Marta Lynch, un personaje trágico - diario Clarin
Marta Lynch recorded at the Library of Congress for the Hispanic Division’s audio literary archive on May 24, 1978

1925 births
1985 deaths
Writers from Buenos Aires
20th-century Argentine women writers
1985 suicides
Suicides by firearm in Argentina